Andrew Michael Baron (born 1970) is the founder of Rocketboom, video aggregator Magma and Humanwire, and the co-founder of Know Your Meme. Baron has taught undergraduate and graduate classes at Parsons and was teaching IDTech at M.I.T. when he came up with the idea for Rocketboom. In 2017 Baron was arrested on charges that he stole money from his non-profit, Humanwire, to which he pled no contest. Forensic accounting verified Baron's side of the story and ended the court case. He pled no contest in order to end the case as quickly as possible.

Early life
Baron holds a BA in Philosophy from Bates College and an MFA in Design and Technology from Parsons School of Design.

Early career 
In 1999, Baron was the owner of a visual and performing arts gallery, Movements Gallery on 6th Street in Austin, Texas which the Austin Chronicle named 'Best New Multi-Disciplinary Space in Austin' in the 'Best of Austin's Critics Poll'.

An active music composer throughout the 1990s and early 2000s, Baron scored numerous scores for Austin-area artists, including "Mad About Harry", a film by AMFILMS awarded as a Hollywood Film Festival, 2000 finalist. He was appointed by the City of Austin Arts Commission to serve as a Mixed Arts Advisory Panelist, 2001.

Online video 

After releasing Rocketboom in late 2004, Baron established himself as one of the first vloggers and arguably one of the most influential. With Rocketboom, Baron built one of the first large audiences around a video show, and went on to generate the first large-scale advertising deals.

On August 19, 2005, Baron was interviewed on CBS Evening News. In an "Eye on America", segment  CBS veteran Jim Axelrod commented on the effort at daily news coverage on a limited budget and Baron's early grasp of the next Internet wave.  "You know what they call that? Vision."

Baron directed a portion of "Killer," an episode of CSI: Crime Scene Investigation which aired February 2, 2006.

Steve Jobs featured Baron's Rocketboom on stage when releasing the video iPod and again when releasing the AppleTV.

In March 2006, Baron commented on the sale of a week of advertising for $40,000 on eBay in Brandweek:

In 2008, Baron created the first version of the Know Your Meme database, to accompany a spin-off show he created and produced for Rocketboom.

Also in 2008, with one of the most followed Twitter accounts, Baron made international news when he put his Twitter account up for sale on eBay.

Baron released his third major site, Magma, in 2009.

In 2011, Baron sold Know Your Meme to Cheezburger in a reported "low seven-figure deal".

Awards
Baron's work had been recognized by the Webbys, the Vloggies and Streamys.

Personal life
Andrew Baron is the son of trial lawyer Fred Baron. Andrew Baron made international news again in 2008, when he used his blog to plead with a drug company to help save his father's life.

Arrest for fraud
On November 16, 2017, Baron was charged with theft in excess of $100,000 from Humanwire, the nonprofit he established to help Syrian refugees. Baron entered a plea of no contest in October 2018. "Prosecutors dropped two counts of theft between $100,000 and $1 million as part of the plea deal." Baron was also given a one-year deferred sentence, charged $26,999.97 in restitution, and made to perform 40 hours of community service. "An investigative report by The Denver Post in 2017  found that the charity, which Baron founded in 2015, struggled with delays in promised aid to refugees. The newspaper found that more than 100 refugees who had been promised aid from Humanwire faced evictions and other deprivations, according to interviews with former volunteers, workers and donors."

References 

Axelrod, Jim. CBS Evening News: "Eye on America" (August 19, 2005)
Farhi, Paul. "Rocketboom!": American Journalism Review (June–July, 2006)

External links 

Andrew Baron's Official Blog
Andrew Baron's Biography

1970 births
American television directors
Television producers from New York City
American Internet celebrities
Living people
Parsons School of Design alumni
Bates College alumni